Sulphur Spring (also known as Crater Hills Geyser), is a geyser in the Hayden Valley region of Yellowstone National Park in the United States.

See also 
 List of Yellowstone geothermal features

References

Geysers of Wyoming
Geothermal features of Park County, Wyoming
Geothermal features of Yellowstone National Park
Bodies of water of Park County, Wyoming